Te Pīhopatanga o Te Manawa o Te Wheke (the bishopric of the heart of the octopus; aka Te Hui Amorangi..., lit. the synod...) is an Episcopal polity (or Diocese) of the Anglican Church in Aotearoa, New Zealand and Polynesia. The Hui Amorangi (episcopal unit) extends from the Bombay Hills south of Auckland through to Taumarunui in the King Country. Te Manawa o Te Wheke is one of 5 Hui Amorangi (episcopal units) that comprise Te Pīhopatanga o Aotearoa, the Māori Anglican Church in Aotearoa/New Zealand.

In 2015 this Pīhopatanga (bishopric) underwent a major restructure which resulted in the disestablishment of Archdeaconries and the merging of some Pariha (parish). It also led to the creation of the role of Te Manutaki, a senior cleric who on behalf of the bishop, oversees and implements the mission and ministry of the Amorangi.

Ministry 
There are 14 Rohe (regions) within Te Manawa o Te Wheke. The Rohe are grouped into 7 Rohe Mihana (Mission Districts), each led by a Missioner:

(Te Rohe Mihana o Waikato)
 Taupiri
 Ngati Haua
 Kirikiriroa
 Puaha o Waikato / Tuakau
 Taumarunui

(Te Rohe Mihana o Waiariki)
 Te Ngae
 Ohinemutu
 Tauponui-a-Tia

(Te Rohe Mihana o Mataatua)
 Whakatāne
 Kawerau
 Ruatoki
 Murupara

(Te Rohe Mihana o Tauranga Moana)
 Tauranga
 Maketu
 Pukehina
 Te Puke

(Te Rohe Mihana o Hauraki)
 Parawai
 Paeroa
 Kennedy's Bay

(Te Rohe Mihana o Te Kaha)

 Ōpōtiki
 Tōrere
 Te Kaha
 Raukokore
 Kauaetangohia

Ministry also takes place in:
 prison, school and hospital chaplaincies
 relational ministries including Kahui Wāhine (women's ministry), Kahui Tane (men's ministry), and Kahui Rangatahi (youth ministry)

Structure 
The Hui Amorangi is governed by a hinota, a representative synod that meets annually. The Amorangi Whaiti executive meets several times a year, to discuss matters pertaining to the Hui Amorangi.

The Hui Amorangi comes under the Episcopal leadership of te Pīhopa o (the Bishop of) Te Manawa o Te Wheke, Ngarahu Katene. Katene was ordained (consecrated) as a bishop at Te Papa-i-o-uru Marae, Rotorua on 14 October 2006. Katene is the first elected Pīhopa o Te Manawa o Te Wheke. In 2019 Archbishop Don Tamihere (Te Pihopa o Aotearoa) appointed Bishop Ngarahu as the Vicar General of Te Pihopatanga o Aotearoa. In this role, when delegated, Katene acts as the Senior Bishop for the Maori Anglican Church.

Since 2017, David Moxon (archbishop emeritus) has served as He Pīhopa Āwhina (an honorary assistant bishop).

Archdeacon Ngira Simmonds is Te Manutaki | Director of Mission and Education. In this role he led all administrative, educational, missional and managerial matters for Te Manawa o Te Wheke. Archdeacon Simmonds is also the Chaplain to Kingi Tuheitia Potatau Te Wherowhero VII, the Maori King. Jasmin Haimona is the Office Administrator, assisting the bishop and all staff with administrative matters.

Each Mission District is led by a Missioner/ Matanga Mihingare. The role of a Missioner is twofold:
1 – To extend the educational work of the Amorangi to the Rohe by providing local educational initiatives
2 – To act as an extension of the Bishop's pastoral ministry in that Rohe. Missioner's oversee all ministry and mission in their Rohe and report back to the Bishop frequently.

 The Missioner of Waiariki is the Venerable Joe Huta
 The Missioner of Mataatua is the Venerable Dr Te Waaka Melboure
 The Missioner of Tauranga Moana is the Reverend Wiremu Anania
 The Missioner of Hauraki is vacant
 The Missioner of Waikato is the Reverend Father Cruz Karauti-Fox
The Missioner of Te Kaha is the Reverend Bettina Maxwell.

Rangatahi (children and youth) ministry is a strong priority for Te Manawa o Te Wheke. This ministry is led by two Enablers:

 Kaiwhakamana Rangarahi: Tauranga Moana, Mataatua, Te Kaha is Sophie Anania
 Kaiwhakamana Rangarahi: Waikato, Hauraki, Waiariki is Mira Martin

References

External links
 Provincial Media Site
 Provincial Synod Site

Anglican dioceses in New Zealand